Empirical software engineering (ESE) is a subfield of software engineering (SE) research that uses empirical research methods to study and evaluate an SE phenomenon of interest. The phenomenon may refer to software development tools/technology, practices, processes, policies, or other human and organizational aspects.

ESE has roots in experimental software engineering, but as the field has matured the need and acceptance for both quantitative and qualitative research has grown. Today, common research methods used in ESE for primary and secondary research are the following:

Primary research (experimentation, case study research, survey research, simulations in particular software Process simulation)
Secondary research methods (Systematic reviews, Systematic mapping studies, rapid reviews, tertiary review)

Teaching empirical software engineering 
Three comprehensive books for students, professionals and researchers interested in ESE are available.

Research community 
Journals, conferences, and communities devoted specifically to ESE:

 Empirical Software Engineering: An International Journal
 International Symposium on Empirical Software Engineering and Measurement
 International Software Engineering Research Network (ISERN)

References 

Software engineering